Dzianis Simanovich (born 20 April 1987 in Chișinău, Moldova) is a racewalker for Belarus. He competed in the 20 km walk at the 2008 and 2012 Summer Olympics, where he placed 28th and 12th respectively.

References

1987 births
Living people
Belarusian male racewalkers
Moldovan male racewalkers
Olympic athletes of Belarus
Athletes (track and field) at the 2008 Summer Olympics
Athletes (track and field) at the 2012 Summer Olympics
Athletes (track and field) at the 2016 Summer Olympics
Sportspeople from Chișinău
World Athletics Championships athletes for Belarus